Jan Verheyen (born 9 July 1944) is a retired Belgian footballer.

During his career he played for K. Beerschot V.A.C. and R.S.C. Anderlecht. He earned 33 caps for the Belgium national football team, and participated in the 1970 FIFA World Cup and UEFA Euro 1972.

Honours

Player

K Beerschot VAC 

 Belgian Cup: 1970–71

RSC Anderlecht

 Belgian First Division: 1971–72, 1973–74
 Belgian Cup: 1971–72, 1972–73, 1974-75
 Belgian League Cup: 1973, 1974

International 

 UEFA European Championship: 1972 (Third place)

References
 Royal Belgian Football Association: Number of caps
 
 

1944 births
Living people
People from Hoogstraten
Belgian footballers
Association football midfielders
Belgium international footballers
1970 FIFA World Cup players
UEFA Euro 1972 players
Belgian Pro League players
K. Beerschot V.A.C. players
R.S.C. Anderlecht players
Royale Union Saint-Gilloise players
Footballers from Antwerp Province